Niphona fasciculata is a species of beetle in the family Cerambycidae. It was described by Maurice Pic in 1917.

References

fasciculata
Beetles described in 1917